"Makes the Whole World Kin" is a short story written by O. Henry (a pen name for William Sydney Porter), allegedly at Pete's Tavern on Irving Place in New York City. It was originally published in the September 25, 1904 New York Sunday World.

Plot summary
The story starts with a young thief walking through a neighbourhood,  scouting for his next house. The thief is described as an ordinary man, with no extreme tendencies.

Once he finds a respectable house, the thief climbs inside through an open window. Once inside, he scouts for valuable items. He discovers, to his amazement, that a light had been left on inside one of the bedrooms. As he walks inside, he finds an old man lying in bed, asleep. The thief wakes the man and instructs  him to raise his hands.  The old man can only lift one arm and proceeds to inform the thief that he suffers from rheumatism. The thief, shocked at what he hears, lowers the gun and tells his victim that he as well, suffers from the disease. They proceed to exchange words of comfort about the haunting pain, and the young thief asks for tips to dull the swellings. Though both are filled with hope, the old man warns the thief that the pain only gets worse and he must find a way to cope with it, in his later years. The old man, suggests that he have a drink.

The young thief invites the old man for a drink at the local pub. He helps the old man get dressed and the two make their way for the bar. Outside the house, the old man realises that he has no money with him - the thief, kindly, offers to pay for the drinks.

Adaptations

1962
In 1962, Leonid Gaidai made a feature-length film Strictly Business, made up of three short stories based on O. Henry. The second segment was "Makes the Whole World Kin".

The film starred Yuri Nikulin as the young thief, and Rostislav Plyatt as the old man.

This version of the film is shot in black and white and set during the early 1900s. The film uses the full dialogue from the original short story. Gaidai specifically chose actors with a more comedic background to satirize the pain that the thief and the old man have in common.

2009
In 2009, Sanzhar Sultanov adapted the screenplay into a modern-day version of Makes the Whole World Kin.

The film starred Paul Calderón as the old man and Alex Mills as the young thief.

This version of the film is shot in color and set in modern-day times. Sultanov adapted the screenplay, making the dialogue more fitting to today's speech. Sultanov chose actors with a dramatic, method acting approach to display the truthful effect of rheumatic pain.

Shakespeare
In William Shakespeare's Troilus and Cressida, Act III, Scene iii - Ulysses, speaking to Achilles says that "One Touch of Nature Makes the Whole World Kin".

In this quote, Nature is defined as:

Though this has become a famous speech of Ulysses and often quoted, it is a curious fact, and one on the whole redounding to the credit of humanity, that the line is never quoted in the sense in which Ulysses uses it.

References

External links
 Free text of Makes the Whole World Kin
 
 
 

1904 short stories
Short stories adapted into films
Crime short stories
American short stories
Short stories by O. Henry